Björkskatan, often called Björx, is a residential area in Luleå, Sweden. It is located on the island of Hertsön and had 4,487 inhabitants in 2010.

References

External links
Björkskatan at Luleå Municipality

Luleå